Hung Hsiu-chu (born 7 April 1948) is a Taiwanese politician. As a member of the Kuomintang (KMT), she has served the party as a Deputy Chairperson and Deputy Secretary-General. Hung was first elected to the legislature in 1990, and was the Vice President of the Legislative Yuan from 2012 to 2016, her eighth term. She became the first female deputy speaker of the Legislative Yuan. She became the Kuomintang's first elected chairwoman later that year, serving until June 2017.

Having a political background in the field of education, she has focused much of legislative tenure on the quality of, and access to, higher education in Taiwan. Known as "xiao la jiao" or "little hot pepper" for her straight-talking style, she is often compared to former Alaska Governor Sarah Palin.

The Kuomintang nominated Hung as the party's presidential candidate for the 2016 elections on 19 July 2015, a month after she had won the party's primary election. Her public support remained low, and she was replaced as candidate by KMT Chairman Eric Chu. Hung succeeded Chu as the Kuomintang's first elected female leader in March 2016 after the defeat of the KMT in the 2016 elections.

Family background
Hung was born in Taipei County (now New Taipei City), Taiwan. Her father, Hung Zi-yu, born in Yuyao, Zhejiang, was a victim of political prosecution during the White Terror in Taiwan. He worked for the government Monopoly Bureau in mainland China prior to 1946. In February 1946, he moved to Taiwan with the Nationalist Government and became deputy manager of a sugar factory under the Taiwan Sugar Corporation. After the February 28 Incident, the general manager of Taiwan Sugar was accused of (and later executed for) being an agent of the Communist Party in 1950, and Hung's father was implicated in the case. While he was eventually acquitted on that charge, the court sentenced him to three years and three months imprisonment at the offshore Green Island prison for political and moral 'reeducation.' Following his release from prison, he failed to find formal employment for the ensuing 40 years, and the family was in financial straits, with Hung's father doing random ghostwriting services for elderly legislators and her mother working at a factory.

Hung recalled, "I remember that the police visited our house frequently when I was a child. My parents sometimes frightened the children by saying that the police will visit if we misbehaved." But her father never dwelt on the past in front of the children: "although my father had resentments toward the authorities, regrets within his heart, and guilt for the family and children, he never expressed those feelings. I only heard him complain once to my mother, 'Haven't the KMT hurt us enough?'" Even with the family in a poor financial status after his release from prison, Hung's father was still hospitable to his friends and often invited them over for dinner and conversation.

Early life

Hung was born in Taipei County on 7 April 1948 as the second eldest child of the family. Hung attended Dongyuan Elementary School and Taipei Second Girls' High School (now Taipei Municipal Zhongshan Girls High School). She excelled in public speaking and storytelling contests even as far back as elementary school and won many awards. A reporter from The China Times called Hung "the talkative little genius" when she won first place in a citywide storytelling contest as a fifth grader. In high school, she lost to Chiao Jen-ho in a speech contest (Chiao later became her college classmate). Hung said, "That was one of the only two public speaking contest losses in my life." (The other one was to renowned author Liu Yong.) During her schooling, she had excellent skills in speech and writing, but her weakness was math, scoring very poorly in math in the college entrance exams. Hung's father had high expectations of her to pursue an education in law due to his own political persecution experience. Hung thus only applied to six law schools, and was accepted by the College of Chinese Culture (the present-day Chinese Culture University) in Taipei at the Department of Law with a tuition-waiver scholarship from Chang Chi-yun, the college's founder. During college, Hung worked in the evenings as a tutor to help support her family and pay for her college expenses.

Early career
After graduating from college in 1970, Hung took the Bar Exam, but did not pass in her first attempt. That year, the Ministry of Education extended mandatory public education to nine years and Hung began her ten-year career in education. Hung first taught at the Xihu High School of Industry and Commerce, and the following year she started teaching at the Taipei County Municipal Xiufeng Senior High School, also serving as Director of Student Affairs.

Hung earned her Master of Arts degree in Education from Northeast Missouri University (now Truman State University) in August 1991 in the United States, and she also took continuing education coursework at National Chengchi University and National Taiwan Normal University.

Hung joined KMT in 11th grade when she was recommended by her dean as an excellent student, and often participated in party activities.

In 1980, she met Song Shi-xuan, head of the KMT's Taiwan Provincial Branch, who enlisted her as a leader of the branch's women's division of Taipei County until 1986. She also served three years at the party headquarters in Taipei and as editor for KMT Taiwan Province Department in 1986-1990. With many years of party experience under her belt, Hung began to seek the party's nomination for the National Assembly, but the KMT's Deputy Secretary-General, Guan Zhong, encouraged her to run for the Legislative Yuan instead.

Political career

Legislative Yuan
Hung entered her first Legislative Election campaign in 1989. Her KMT branch director objected to her request, and therefore did not give her time off during the campaign. Hung insisted on entering the primary and was only able to participate in the events on weekends as a candidate. She had her cousin go to the events on weekdays and hold up her poster whenever her name was called as a silent protest of her helpless absence. This was widely reported by the media and Hung won the primary by marginal votes, and thus was nominated by the party. Hung said, "My father passed away the moment when I won the primary. It seemed that he was waiting for the final confirmation. I was whispering in his ear, 'Bless me with the nomination if you want me to embark on my career in this path of politics.'" Hung subsequently won the seat in the legislative election and began her career in the Legislative Yuan for eight consecutive terms.

Hung almost lost her second election term of Legislative Yuan on 19 December 1992 to Zhao Shao-Kang in the same constituency. Hung had joined in 1989 new secondary political coalition within the KMT, but the coalition parted from KMT to form the New Party in 1993 and Hung decided to stay with the original KMT.

Hung was elected again in the third election term on 2 December 1995 of the legislative campaign. Taipei County was divided into three constituencies during the fourth election term on 5 December 1998 with too many candidates, therefore Hung transferred to the non-partisan division and was elected again. She again beat the People First Party in the fifth election term on 1 December 2001 and won by marginal votes. Hung ranked first in polls in the sixth election term on 11 December 2004 and won with the second highest number of votes.

She was again elected as the non-partisan legislature in the seventh election term on 12 January 2008. In August 2008, she revealed secret accounts held abroad by former President Chen Shui-bian to the public which infuriated Chen's supporters. Hung won the election again in the eighth election term on 14 January 2012.

Hung has been on the Education and Culture Committee in the Legislative Yuan for many years. She worked tirelessly to promote legislation for educational reform, dropout students, teachers benefits, medical and pharmaceutical regulations and universal healthcare system. The number of female legislators were still scarce in 1992 and Hung was named several times in different organizations as top legislator for her overall excellent professional performance.

Kuomintang

2007 KMT chairmanship election
On 27 April 2007, Hung joined the KMT chairmanship election, going against former acting KMT Chairman Wu Po-hsiung. She eventually lost to Wu with 13.0% of the votes to Wu's 87.0%.

KMT Vice Chairmanship
Hung was appointed Vice Chairperson of KMT by the KMT Central Standing Committee on 15 February 2012 when the former Vice Chairman Tseng Yung-chuan resigned.

2014 ROC local elections
KMT lost majority of the seats in the local elections on 29 November 2014, resulting in the resignation of Party Chairman Ma Ying-jeou, with both first and second Vice Chairmen declined the acting position. Wu Den-yih was nominated to be the acting Chairman and Hung became the acting Secretary-General by the Central Committee on 3 December 2014. Eric Chu became the new Party Chairman after winning the party chairmanship election on 17 January 2015 unopposed. Hung was released from the position thereafter on 18 January 2015.

2016 KMT chairmanship election

Other careers
Hung has been the director of the ROC Children and Youth Welfare Association, chairperson of Chinese Youth Care Association, chairperson of ROC Tug of War Association (subsequently Chinese Taipei Tug of War Association), chairperson of Chinese Love Alliance of Care for the Weak, deputy director of Youth Work Association, deputy director of Women Work Association, chairperson of Chinese Care of Disadvantaged Groups Alliance, chairperson of ROC World Federation of Folk Dance, president of ROC Foundation of Kidney Prevention and general-counsel of ROC Sports Federation.

Legislative Yuan vice presidency

Vice presidency appointment
After her election for vice presidency of Legislative Yuan in 2012 by an overwhelming 69 votes, Hung said that she was familiar with the situation at the Legislative Yuan, and that respecting and abiding by the regulations within Legislative Yuan was really important. She made ROC history being the first woman elected to the post and took office on 1 February 2012.

4th Straits Forum
During the opening remark of the 4th Straits Forum held in Xiamen, Fujian, in June 2012, Hung, in her capacity as Vice Chairperson of KMT, said that although mainland China was bigger and stronger, the greatest appeal that mainland China has for Taiwan is not only growing competitiveness, but also respect and goodwill given to the people of Taiwan.

6th Straits Forum
During the opening remarks of the 6th Straits Forum held in Xiamen, Fujian in June 2014, Hung said that she hoped that both sides will cherish their increasingly close links and continue mutual dialogue and exchanges, because by doing so it will be possible to inject a new energy into cross-strait relations. She added that the forum remains full of enthusiasm and vitality despite the recent setback on the signing of the Cross-Strait Service Trade Agreement from the Sunflower Student Movement. She did acknowledge the widening gap between the rich and the poor in Taiwan as well as the younger generations dissatisfaction towards the government that also exist in many other countries due to the global trend of moving towards free trade. She said that the government would be more open and tolerant to negotiate with the public and take challenges.

2016 presidential campaign

KMT presidential primary
On 20 April 2015, Hung registered for the KMT presidential primary held prior to the 2016 elections. She pledged for fair and open election process under a democratic mechanism. Hung passed the 30% approval rating threshold in three KMT presidential primary polls on 14 June 2015, with an average approval rating of 46.20%. She was officially nominated as the KMT presidential candidate during the National Party Congress on 19 July 2015 at Sun Yat-sen Memorial Hall in Taipei. During her speech, she promised peace, openness, equal distribution of wealth and morality to the people of Taiwan if she were elected. She would also push for a peaceful cross-strait relations based on the 1992 Consensus.

Presidential campaign
Hung started her campaign in Taichung on 23 July 2015. During an interview with a local radio station, Hung stated she would take the interests of the people into account, as well as the ROC constitution, when making decisions. She promised to sign a peace agreement that would improve military trust between Taiwan and China. She hoped that the mainland will allow Taiwan more opportunities to join international organizations and thereby boost its regional economic strength. She also pledged to improve the economy through job creation and build a just and equal society. Hung's campaign has been compared to the New Party's pro-Chinese unification stance. Her China policy, known as "one China, same interpretation," aims to have the People's Republic of China recognize the government of the Republic of China without recognizing the ROC as a state. President Ma Ying-jeou has supported this view, calling it no different from his own "one China, different interpretation" based on the 1992 consensus, though Kuomintang chairman Eric Chu has opposed it. Hung's run for president had been continually beset by rumors that she would withdraw from the race prior to the elections, an action Hung denied considering. On 26 July 2015, the spokesperson of Hung's campaign team Jack Yu (游梓翔) said that he would tender his resignation on 1 August 2015 to return to his teaching position at Shih Hsin University. However, he stayed on as adviser to Hung's public and media relations team. With a KMT-sanctioned poll revealing that Hung's support was at 13% in early October 2015, Central Standing Committee member Chiang Shuo-ping proposed a party congress be called to review Hung's candidacy. Due to her poor performance in polls, 91% of delegates at the congress, held on 17 October, chose to replace Hung as KMT presidential candidate. KMT chairman Eric Chu was selected as the replacement candidate. Hundreds of Hung's supporters gathered outside Sun Yat-sen Memorial Hall to protest the party congress being held inside the building. On 22 October, Hung announced that she would return all campaign contributions made since 23 September, a total of NT$11.83 million, to 2,633 donors.

After her presidential campaign came to a close, New Party chairman Yok Mu-ming attempted to convince Hung to switch parties and run for the legislature as a New Party candidate. Hung rejected this offer in November 2015, announcing her intention to stay with the KMT, but not to run a legislative reelection campaign in 2016. Hung later wrote a book about her presidential campaign, titled Unfinished Presidential Road. In December, Chu invited Hung to lead the group of advisers he had assembled for his campaign.

Kuomintang chairmanship

Party leadership campaign
Chu lost the presidential election, and subsequently resigned his post as KMT chair. On 19 January 2016, Hung announced that she would run for the position. On 22 February, Hung submitted the signatures of 84,822 party members in support of her candidacy. She was confirmed as a candidate four days later, having collected 38,407 valid signatures. Hung won 78,829 votes in the leadership election, and became the first elected chairwoman of the party.

11th KMT-CPC forum
On 30 October 2016, Hung led a delegation to attend the 11th Cross-strait Peace Development Forum which was held on 2–3 November in Beijing. The delegation included Jason Hu, Steve Chan, Huang Ching-hsien (黃清賢), Alex Tsai, Chang Jung-kung (張榮恭) and Wu Bi-chu  (吳碧珠). She met with General Secretary of the Communist Party of China Xi Jinping in her capacity as the Kuomintang chairperson.

2017 KMT chair election
Hung was the first to declare her candidacy for the 2017 KMT chair election. She finished second to Wu Den-yih.

Later political career
In August 2019, Hung stated that she would contest the 2020 Taiwan legislative election, in the newly formed Tainan sixth district. She was formally nominated by the Kuomintang in September but lost to Wang Ting-yu, a sitting legislator in a different district, in the election.  

In 2022, Hung complimented Chinese anti-terrorism efforts in Xinjiang, which some consider to constitute human rights violations.

Personal life
Hung is nicknamed the little hot pepper for her straightforward manner.

References

External links

 

|-

|-

Living people
1948 births
Chairpersons of the Kuomintang
Chinese Culture University alumni
Kuomintang Members of the Legislative Yuan in Taiwan
Kuomintang presidential nominees
Members of the Kuomintang
Members of the 1st Legislative Yuan in Taiwan
Members of the 2nd Legislative Yuan
Members of the 3rd Legislative Yuan
Members of the 4th Legislative Yuan
Members of the 5th Legislative Yuan
Members of the 6th Legislative Yuan
Members of the 7th Legislative Yuan
Members of the 8th Legislative Yuan
New Taipei Members of the Legislative Yuan
Party List Members of the Legislative Yuan
Taiwanese educators
Women opposition leaders
Women legislative deputy speakers